Dao'an (312–385) was a Buddhist monk, author and bibliographer, during the Eastern Jin dynasty. He was from what is now Hebei. His main importance was that of overseer of translation of Buddhist texts into Chinese, organizer of the Chinese sangha, author of exegetical works and compiler of the most important early catalogue of Chinese Buddhist translation in 374. Although this catalogue is itself lost, Sengyou reproduces much of it in his catalogue (T2145) completed in 515.

Dao'an is thought of as the founder of the cult of Maitreya in China.

Life
According to his traditional biography, after the loss of his parents he was raised by an elder cousin. Dao'an left home to join the monastic order at twelve. Ca. 335 CE he visited Linzhang and became a disciple of the famous Kuchean monk and missionary Fotudeng (232-348).
One of his disciples was the monk Huiyuan, whose teachings inspired Pure Land Buddhism. He was active in Xiangyang until the Former Qin ruler Fu Jian captured the city in 379 and brought Dao'an to Chang'an. He spent the last years of life translating and interpreting scripture as well as compiling a catalogue of scriptures. He also advocated that all monks and nuns take Shi 釋 as a surname, from the first character of Gautama Buddha's title in Chinese, Shìjiāmóuní ( "Śākyamuni").

References

External links
 Digital Dictionary of Buddhism  (log in with userID "guest")
 Dao´An, Encyclopædia Britannica Online

314 births
385 deaths
Sixteen Kingdoms translators
Sanskrit–Chinese translators
Chinese bibliographers
Former Qin Buddhist monks
People from Hengshui
Writers from Hebei
Later Zhao Buddhist monks
Jin dynasty (266–420) Buddhist monks
Ran Wei
4th-century Chinese translators